The WAFU Zone A Women's Cup is a women's association football competition contested by national teams of the West African Football Union (WAFU). The WAFU region is divided into two zone and each has its own tournament.

The first edition was planned for December 2019 but then postponed two months. It was then played in 2020 with eight teams. The only national team from Zone A not entering was Mauritania.

The relevant WAFU Zone B Women's Cup was first played out two years earlier in 2018.

Results

Comprehensive team results by tournament
Legend
 – Champions
 – Runners-up
 – Third place
 – Fourth place
Q – Qualified for upcoming tournament
 – Did not qualify
 – Did not enter / Withdrew / Banned
 – Hosts

For each tournament, the number of teams (in brackets) are shown.

Overall team records
Teams are ranked by total points, then by goal difference, then by goals scored.

Awards

Winning coaches

Top goalscorers

Fair play award

References

West African Football Union competitions